Andrzej Wyglenda (born 4 May 1941 in Rybnik, Poland) is a former Polish motorcycle speedway rider who has won 1971 Speedway World Pairs Championship and Speedway World Team Cup three times. He was won Individual Polish Champion title four times. Between 1985 and 1989 he was a Member of the Sejm of Poland.

World Final appearances

Individual World Championship
 1964 -  Göteborg, Ullevi - 12th - 4pts
 1965 -  London, Wembley Stadium - 15th - 2pts
 1967 -  London, Wembley Stadium - 15th - 2pts
 1969 -  London, Wembley Stadium - 15th - 2pts
 1970 -  Wrocław, Olympic Stadium - 8th - 7pts
 1973 -  Chorzów, Silesian Stadium - Reserve - 0pts

World Pairs Championship
 1971 -  Rybnik, Rybnik Municipal Stadium (with Jerzy Szczakiel) - Winner - 30pts (15)

World Team Cup
 1964 -  Abensberg, Abensberg Stadion (with Andrzej Pogorzelski / Zbigniew Podlecki / Marian Kaiser / Marian Rose) - 4th - 16pts (8)
 1965 -  Kempten (with Antoni Woryna / Zbigniew Podlecki / Andrzej Pogorzelski) - Winner - 38pts (11)
 1966 -  Wrocław, Olympic Stadium (with Andrzej Pogorzelski / Marian Rose / Antoni Woryna / Edmund Migoś) - Winner - 41pts (11)
 1967 -  Malmö, Malmö Stadion (with Antoni Woryna / Jerzy Trzeszkowski / Andrzej Pogorzelski / Zbigniew Podlecki) - 2nd - 26pts (9)
 1968 -  London, Wembley Stadium (with Edmund Migoś / Paweł Waloszek / Edward Jancarz / Henryk Glücklich) - 3rd - 19pts (2)
 1969 -  Rybnik, Rybnik Municipal Stadium (with Edward Jancarz / Stanisław Tkocz / Henryk Glücklich / Andrzej Pogorzelski) - Winner - 31pts (11)
 1971 -  Wrocław, Olympic Stadium (with Paweł Waloszek / Henryk Glücklich / Antoni Woryna / Edward Jancarz) - 3rd - 19pts (2)

Domestic competitions
Individual Polish Championship
 1964 - Winner
 1965 - 2nd
 1968 - Winner
 1969 - Winner
 1970 - 2nd
 1971 - 3rd
 1973 - Winner

Political career
In Polish legislative election on 13 October 1985 he was a candidate of the Polish United Workers' Party (PZPR) to the Sejm of the People's Republic of Poland. His term was started on 13 October 1985 and was end 3 June 1989. He was a member of the Social policy, health and Sport Committee.

See also
 Poland national speedway team
 Speedway in Poland
 List of Polish United Workers' Party members

References

External links
 (pl) Sejm IX term webside

1941 births
Living people
Polish speedway riders
Polish sportsperson-politicians
People from Rybnik
Sportspeople from Silesian Voivodeship
Speedway World Pairs Champions